Oreosparte is a monotypic genus of flowering plants belonging to the family Apocynaceae. The only species is Oreosparte celebica.

Its native range is Western and Central Malesia.

References

Apocynaceae
Monotypic Apocynaceae genera